Kim Na-woon (born May 11, 1970) is a South Korean actress. She made her acting debut in 1987, and is most active as a supporting actress in television dramas.

Filmography

Television series

Film

Variety/radio show

Music video

Awards and nominations

References

External links 
 Kim Na-woon's The Kitchen blog at Naver 
 
 
 

1970 births
Living people
South Korean television actresses
South Korean film actresses
Seoul Institute of the Arts alumni